Pearl is a city in Rankin County, Mississippi, United States, located on the east side of the Pearl River across from the state capital Jackson. The population was 25,092 at the 2010 census. It is part of the Jackson Metropolitan Statistical Area.

Pearl is the 13th largest city in the state and the largest city in Rankin County.

History
After the American Civil War, the bottomlands of the Pearl River were developed for agriculture. The population was sparse until the mid-1900s when the development of the state capital of Jackson in Hinds County to the west spilled over into Rankin County. New residents and industry settled here. Thereafter, growth in the area came from the urban expansion of the capital, control of flood threats from the Pearl River, and improved transportation due to accessible interstates and Jackson-Evers International Airport.

On September 16, 1968, a community meeting was held to discuss the incorporation of Pearl, with all but six of the 657 attending residents favoring incorporation. A "Boundary Committee" proposed several possible boundaries a little more than a month later. The following January the community voted for an  boundary that included the Pearl River to Airport Road, excluding East Jackson and all areas south of Interstate 20 except Cunningham Heights and Grandview Heights. A majority at that meeting also agreed to name the city "Pearl", rather than the alternative proposals of "Riverview" or "Brightsville".

Pearl was affected by the violence of the Ku Klux Klan, and was white-only for most of the 20th Century. In 1970, Pearl had 9,613 white residents and 10 black residents. By the 1990s Pearl had become more racially integrated, and by 2010 blacks made up 23% of the population.

The first mayor, Harris Harvey, was elected, along with council members Jimmy Joe Thompson, W.D. McAlpin, James Netherland, Ophelia Byrd, Mack C Atwood, W.L. Maddox, and Bobby Joe Davis. With the Mississippi Supreme Court ruling of June 5, 1973, the incorporation could proceed. A week later, the state legislature issued a charter. On June 29, 1973, Governor William Winter presided over the first annual Pearl Day Celebration, with the swearing in of the city's new officials, who met for the first time on July 3, 1973.

The Pearl Municipal Separate School District was created on May 18, 1976, by an Ordinance of the City of Pearl Mayor and Board of Aldermen. The first franchise by the City of Pearl for cable television installation was granted on July 6, 1976. The Pearl Chamber of Commerce was formed on August 24, 1978.

On October 1, 1997, Luke Woodham went on a shooting spree that ended at Pearl High School, killing two and injuring seven, after earlier stabbing his mother to death.

Over the years the city has redeveloped the former Pearl High School into City Hall, including the Pearl Police Department, public works departments, and city courts. A large auditorium-style Community Center was built next door. Its clock tower is inscribed with the names of graduates of Pearl High School for the period 1949 through 1989 while the high school occupied the building. A  library opened near City Hall on July 18, 2005.

Geography
Neighboring towns include Flowood, Brandon, Richland and the state capital Jackson.

According to its 2008 Annual Drinking Water Quality Report, Pearl's drinking water comes from the Sparta Sand Aquifer via nine wells that draw the water from it.

Demographics

2020 census

As of the 2020 United States census, there were 27,115 people, 10,463 households, and 6,662 families residing in the city.

2000 census
As of the census of 2000, there were 21,961 people, 8,608 households, and 6,025 families residing in the city. The population density was 1,005.9 people per square mile (388.4/km2). There were 9,128 housing units at an average density of 418.1 per square mile (161.4/km2). The racial makeup of the city was 81.18% White, 16.24% African American, 0.22% Native American, 0.79% Asian, 0.03% Pacific Islander, 0.78% from other races, and 0.75% from two or more races. Hispanic or Latino of any race were 2.03% of the population.

There were 8,608 households, out of which 34.4% had children under the age of 18 living with them, 50.2% were married couples living together, 15.6% had a female householder with no husband present, and 30.0% were non-families. 25.0% of all households were made up of individuals, and 7.4% had someone living alone who was 65 years of age or older. The average household size was 2.55 and the average family size was 3.05.

In the city, the population was spread out, with 26.4% under the age of 18, 10.1% from 18 to 24, 31.8% from 25 to 44, 21.4% from 45 to 64, and 10.3% who were 65 years of age or older. The median age was 34 years. For every 100 females, there were 90.8 males. For every 100 females age 18 and over, there were 86.6 males.

In the most recent census (2010), the racial demographics have changed similar to many other Jackson suburbs. The following are the most current demographics: White alone 69.8%, African American 23.0%, American Indian and Alaska Native 0.2%, Asian 0.9%, Native Hawaiian and Other Pacific Islander 0.2%, Two or More Races 1.7%, Hispanic 6.4%.

The median income for a household in the city was $37,617, and the median income for a family was $42,013. Males had a median income of $30,860 versus $24,610 for females. The per capita income for the city was $17,136. About 9.2% of families and 12.2% of the population were below the poverty line, including 17.3% of those under age 18 and 12.4% of those age 65 or over.

Sports

The  Mississippi Braves or "M-Braves", a Class AA minor league baseball affiliate of the Atlanta Braves moved from Greenville, South Carolina to Pearl before the 2005 season. The M-Braves play in the Southern League. The team had their first game in the brand new Trustmark Park on April 18, 2005, losing to the Montgomery Biscuits.

Parks and recreation
Pearl is home to many parks and recreational facilities.
Center City Complex – softball, baseball, soccer, and offices of the Parks and Recreation Department (has been the site of several United States Specialty Sports Association Regional and National Tournaments)
Pearl Activity Center (Old Boys Club) – baseball, meeting room, and gymnasium
Bright Park – A 2/3 mile physical fitness walking trail through nature and picnic areas
City Park – A family recreation area which includes, picnic areas, reserveable pavilion, children's playground, tennis courts, basketball court, and covered stage
Jenkins Park – A family recreation facility, children's playground, picnic areas, pavilion, 1/2 mile walking trail, and softball field
Old Library Walking Trail – A 1/4 mile walking trail
Henry F. Shepherd Field Walking Trail – A 1/4 mile walking track around the old Pearl High School football field
Center City Walking Trail – A  walking trail winding through the scenic wooded terrain
Pearl Municipal Golf Course – An 18-hole public golf course with a Club House and short order restaurant

Government

Municipal government
The City of Pearl is led by an elected Mayor and Board of Aldermen. Each serves a four-year term. Five of the six aldermen represent single-member districts; the sixth is elected at-large.

State representation
The Mississippi Department of Corrections Central Mississippi Correctional Facility is in an unincorporated area in Rankin County, near Pearl. In 2007 the Mississippi Highway Patrol opened a driver's license facility across the highway from the prison.

The Mississippi Department of Environmental Quality operates the Central Regional Office and the MDEQ Laboratory in unincorporated Rankin County, near Pearl.

Education

Colleges and universities
 Hinds Community College Rankin Campus (state two-year college)

The Rankin County campus of Hinds Community College opened in Pearl on July 1, 1983.

Primary and secondary schools
The City of Pearl's public schools are served by the Pearl Public School District whose Board is appointed by the City of Pearl Board of Aldermen.
Pearl High School
Pearl Junior High School
Pearl Upper Elementary
Northside Elementary
Pearl Lower Elementary

Private schools
 Faith Academy – Grades Pre-kindergarten through 8 (served by the Midsouth Private School Association)
 Park Place Christian Academy – Grades Pre-kindergarten through 12. PPCA graduated its first senior class in May 2012.

Infrastructure

Transportation

Air travel
Pearl is served by Jackson-Evers International Airport, located at Allen C. Thompson Field in Rankin County.

Ground transportation
 Interstate 55
 Interstate 20
 U.S. Highway 49
 U.S. Highway 80 - the main corridor through Pearl
 Mississippi Highway 25 - also known as Lakeland Drive
 Mississippi Highway 475

Public safety
Law enforcement within the city limits of Pearl is handled by the Pearl Police Department. The City has no jail facilities and instead uses the Rankin County Jail, which is operated by the Rankin County Sheriff's Department.

Fire protection and prevention within the city limits of Pearl is handled by the Pearl Fire Department. The department operates four stations throughout the city.

Notable people
Ty Tabor - singer, guitarist for King's X
LeAnn Rimes - singer

References

External links
 

 City of Pearl official web site
 Pearl Chamber of Commerce

Cities in Mississippi
Cities in Rankin County, Mississippi
Cities in Jackson metropolitan area, Mississippi
Populated places established in 1868
Sundown towns in Mississippi